Camp Wisdom station is an at-grade DART Light Rail station along the Blue Line, which is located at 6712 Patrol Way in Dallas, Texas. It opened on October 24, 2016 as part of the South Oak Cliff Corridor extension. DART has hoped that this extension will help spur development south of Ledbetter along the new corridor to UNT Dallas. The station is within walking distance of the Dallas Police Department's South Central station. It also includes bus access from the west side of Patrol Way.

History
Ground was broken for the South Oak Cliff extension, including this station, on October 6, 2014.

References

External links
 - DART South Oak Cliff Extension page

Dallas Area Rapid Transit light rail stations in Dallas
Railway stations in the United States opened in 2016
Railway stations in Dallas County, Texas